Arnold School Pond is a  pond in Pembroke, Massachusetts in the East Pembroke section of the town. The pond is located northeast of Stump Pond, behind the Arnold Elementary School. The outflow is an unnamed stream that leads to Pudding Brook.

External links
Environmental Protection Agency
South Shore Coastal Watersheds - Lake Assessments

Ponds of Plymouth County, Massachusetts
Pembroke, Massachusetts
Ponds of Massachusetts